Oda Jaune (born Michaela Danowska, Michaela Danovska, ; 13 November 1979 in Sofia, Bulgaria) is a Bulgarian painter.

From 1998 to 2003, she studied in the class of Jörg Immendorff at the Kunstakademie Düsseldorf.

In 2012, she won the Pierre Cardin Prize in the category "Best Painter". In 2003, the second prize of the Emprise Art Award.

Personal life 
Jaune married in July 2000 her professor Jörg Immendorff and had a daughter on 13 August 2001. It was her husband Immendorff who invented the pseudonym Oda Jaune.

Career 
Oda Jaune's work has featured in a variety of exhibitions in Europe and the USA, including Musée des Beaux-Arts de Dôle (2017), Musée d'Art Moderne et Contemporain de Saint-Etienne (2016), Musée Départemental d'Art Contemporain de Rochechouart (2015), Musée Rops de Namur (2011), and La Maison Rouge, Paris and me Collectors room, Berlin (2011). In 2018, the National Art Gallery in Sofia, Bulgaria, held a major retrospective of her work, Heartland, with a catalogue published in September 2019 by Hatje Cantz.

Since 2009 she is represented by Galerie Templon in Paris and Brussels.

Exhibitions

Solo exhibitions (selection) 
2019

Hands, Seen, Antwerpen, Belgium

Beyond Gravity, Galerie Templon, Paris, France

2018 

Heartland, National Gallery of Sofia, Sofia, Bulgaria 

2017

Paintings and Sculptures, Galerie Daniel Templon, Brussels, Belgium

2016

Blue Skies, Galerie Daniel Templon, Paris, France

2015

Masks, Galerie Daniel Templon, Paris, France

2011

Confrontation Félicien Rops - Oda Jaune, Musée Félicien Rops, Namur, Belgium

2010

Once in a Blue Moon, Galerie Daniel Templon, Paris, France

2009

May You See Rainbows, Galerie Daniel Templon, Paris, France

2007

Fondazione Mudima, Milan, Italy

2004

Kunsthalle Koblenz, Koblenz, Germany

Publications 
 Oda Jaune, Oda Jaune, Kunsthalle Koblenz, Solo exhibition catalogue, April 2004
 Oda Jaune, Paintings, Galerie Davide Di Maggio Berlin, essay by Gesine Borcherdt, Solo exhibition catalogue, September 2006
 Oda Jaune, Il mistero buffo della pittura, Fondazione Mudima Milano, essay by Achille Bonito Oliva, Solo exhibition catalogue, May 2007
 The Bearable Lightness of Being - The Metaphor of the Space, La Biennale di Venezia, 11. Mostra Internazionale di Architettura, September 2008
 Oda Jaune, May You See Rainbows, Galerie Daniel Templon, essay by Catherine Millet, Solo exhibition catalogue, February 2009
 Oda Jaune, First Water, 100 watercolors, Hatje Cantz, essay by Robert Fleck, October 2010
 Oda Jaune, Once on a Blue Moon, Galerie Daniel Templon, essay by Judicaël Lavrador, Solo exhibition catalogue, November 2010

References

External links
 

1979 births
Bulgarian painters
Living people
Bulgarian women painters
Artists from Sofia
Bulgarian emigrants to Germany
21st-century women artists